Events from the year 1669 in France

Incumbents
 Monarch – Louis XIV

Events
The Paris Opera was founded
The École des Jeunes de langues was founded
The Régiment Royal–La Marine was established

Births
17 August – Jean-Baptiste Brutel de la Rivière, Protestant minister (d. 1742)

Full date missing
Charles d'Agar, painter (d. 1723)
Jacques Bouillart, Benedictine monk (d. 1726)
Philip Bouquett, linguist (d. 1748)
Michel-Celse-Roger de Bussy-Rabutin, churchman and diplomat (d. 1736)

Deaths

18 March – Gilles Boileau, translator (b. 1631)
6 August – Louis, Duke of Vendôme (b. 1612)
8 September – Françoise de Lorraine, Duchess of Vendôme (b. 1592)
10 September – Henrietta Maria of France, Queen of England, Scotland, and Ireland (b. 1609)
29 December – Marin Cureau de la Chambre, physician and philosopher (b. 1594)

Full date missing
Pierre Affre, sculptor (b. 1509)
François Anguier, sculptor (born c.1604)

See also

References

1660s in France